Richard Fiennes, jure uxoris 7th Baron Dacre (1415 – 25 November 1483) was an English knight and hereditary keeper of Herstmonceux Castle, Sussex.

He was the son of Sir Roger Fiennes, Member of Parliament (M.P.) for Sussex, and Elizabeth Holland, who's paternal grandfather was the brother of Thomas Holland, 1st Earl of Kent. His paternal uncle was James Fiennes, 1st Baron Saye and Sele.

Sir Richard Fiennes was the hereditary keeper of Herstmonceux Castle, an office which descended in the Fiennes family until the execution of the ninth baron. By patent of 7 November 1458, King Henry VI of England accepted him as Lord Dacre, and by two writs in 1459 and 1482 Fiennes was summoned to Parliament as Baron Dacre. In 1473, the King made the final award of the lands of the sixth Baron Dacre between the heir male, Humphrey Dacre, the younger of Joan's two surviving uncles; and the heir general, Richard Fiennes, in right of his wife, Joan Dacre, who had succeeded to the suo jure title on 5 January 1458.

Most of the estates went to the heir male with remainder to the heir general while the peerage went to Richard Fiennes in right of his wife. Peerage lawyers have claimed that Richard Fiennes's summons to parliament created a new barony; for, though his wife was a peeress in her own right, his summons was not a courtesy one. J. Horace Round held that the award of 1473 assigning the heir general and her husband precedence of the old barony, over that of the heir male, was a recognition of his wife's accession to the original barony.

Richard married Joan Dacre, 7th Baroness Dacre in June 1446. Children of Richard Fiennes and Joan Dacre:
Sir John Fiennes, born c.1447 in Herstmonceux Castle, Sussex, England; married Alice FitzHugh; father of Thomas Fiennes, 8th Baron Dacre
Sir Thomas Fiennes
Elizabeth Fiennes, married John Clinton, 6th Baron Clinton, great-grandfather of Edward Clinton, 1st Earl of Lincoln
Richard Fiennes
Roger Fiennes

Another (unnamed) daughter is stated in the 1623 Heralds' Visitation of Gloucestershire to have been the 1st and short-lived wife of Sir Walter Denys (d. 1505) of Alveston, Glos., son/heir of Maurice Denys:

References

Richard
1415 births
1483 deaths
7
Peers jure uxoris
People from Herstmonceux